Punch! is a Canadian animated  series that first aired on Teletoon at Night on January 11, 2008, and Télétoon la nuit on January 25, 2008. It was cancelled after a single season of 20 episodes, although both blocks continued to air it very late at night for some time.

References

External links
 

2000s Canadian adult animated television series
2008 Canadian television series debuts
2008 Canadian television series endings
Canadian adult animated comedy television series
English-language television shows
Teletoon original programming